Riselda Selaj is a former Elite artistic Gymnast from Albania. She is an International Champion, Olympic Competitor and All-around, Beam and Vault Balkan Champion. She is the first Albanian gymnast to win 5 gold medals at an international competition and the first gymnast to win 5 medals in the same international competition twice in a row.

Career 
She won gold medals for the all-around, beam, floor, vault and uneven bars and a team bronze medal. She won the all-around, beam and vault Balkan Championship in 2009, in  Macedonia.

Selaj became a member of the Albanian senior team in 2008. She is a nine-time Albania all-around Champion winning four as a junior and five as a senior.

Selaj participated in the 2009 World Championship in London, performing very well on beam. She was part of the Albanian team during the Mediterranean Games in Italy, where she was qualified in all-around final ranking 13th place, and on vault final, ranking 6th.

Selaj competed at European Championships and at the European Youth Olympic Festival (EYOF).

Selaj announced her retirement from gymnastics on October, 2014.

References

External links

 
 
 
 
 
 

Albanian female artistic gymnasts
1993 births
Living people